Hewletts Creek is a stream in New Hanover County, North Carolina, in the United States.  It is the only stream of its name in the United States.

Hewletts Creek was named for a family of settlers.

Variant names
According to the Geographic Names Information System, it has also been known historically as: 
Hewlet Creek
Hewlets Creek

Course
Hewletts Creek rises on the Cape Fear River divide in Pine Valley Country Club of Wilmington, North Carolina and then flows east and southeast to the Intracoastal Waterway in Masonboro, North Carolina.

Watershed
Hewletts Creek drains  of area, receives about 57.9 in/year of precipitation, and has a wetness index of 586.63 and is about 11% forested.

See also
List of rivers of North Carolina

References

Rivers of New Hanover County, North Carolina
Rivers of North Carolina